Chhattisgarhi ( / ) is an eastern Indo-Aryan language , spoken by approximately 16 million people from Chhattisgarh & other states. It is mostly spoken in the Indian states of Chhattisgarh, Odisha, Madhya Pradesh & Maharashtra. It is closely related to Odia but counted by the Indian national census as a dialect of Hindi.

Phonology

Consonants 

  can also be heard as a tap .

Vowels 

  can also be heard as back . 
 Nasalization is also phonemically distinctive.

See also 
 Languages of India
 Languages with official status in India
 List of Indian languages by total speakers

Sources
G. A. Zograph: Languages of South Asia, 1960 (translated by G.L. Campbell, 1982), Routledge, London.
H. L. Kavyopadhyaya, G. A. Grierson and L. P. Kavya-Vinod. 1921. A grammar of the Chhattisgarhi dialect of Eastern Hindi.
Masica, Colin P. 1993. The Indo-Aryan languages. (Cambridge Lamguage Surveys.) Cambridge: Cambridge University Press.
Boehm, Kelly Kilgo. 2022. A Preliminary Sociolinguistic Survey of the Chhattisgarhi-Speaking Peoples of India. SIL International.

References

Bibliography
C. K. Chandrakar, "Chhattisgarhi Shabadkosh"
C. K. Chandrakar, "Manak Chhattisgarhi Vyakaran"
C. K. Chandrakar, "Chhattisgarhi Muhawara Kosh"
Chhattisgarh Rajbhasha Aayog, "Prashashnik Shabdkosh Vol. I & II"

External links

Hindi languages
Languages of India
Eastern Indo-Aryan languages
Culture of Chhattisgarh